The Earl was an automobile manufactured in Jackson, Michigan by Earl Motors Incorporated from 1921 to 1923.  The Earl was a continuation of the Briscoe.  The Model 40 offered both open and closed models with a four-cylinder engine. Approximately 2,000 vehicles were produced.  When the Earl debuted in 1921, the tourer cost just $1285. The company also claimed that $100 worth of "extras", such as linoleum floor boards and carpets front and rear were included in the base price.

Benjamin Briscoe appointed Clarence A. Earl as president of Briscoe Motor Corporation in March 1921.  Earl had previously been vice-president of Willys-Overland.  Briscoe suddenly left in October of the same year, tired of all the misfortune he had suffered in the automotive field to date.  He left his car and company to Earl.  Earl then announced to the press that he would be forming Earl Motors and bringing out a new four-cylinder car.  This was really just the Briscoe car with small modifications to solve some of its problems, as well as being slightly larger and more powerful.

Earl assumed many problems with the company, not least of which was one and a  half million dollars of debt.  Luckily, Clarence Earl easily raised more capital from bankers.  On the Earl Motors board were several bankers, as well as executives from various supplier firms.  Included in the latter group was George C. Scobie, who had been with Price-Waterhouse and Hayes Wheel Company, and was now vice-president of the new organization.  Clarence Earl  developed disagreements with all these board members over the future path of his company, and resigned in November 1922.  He then became president of National.  Earl had wanted to become a high-volume producer, while the rest of the board preferred a lower-volume, more fiscally conservative approach.

The bankers and supplier executives now took over the company, with George Scobie as president. They promptly reorganized as the Earl Motor Manufacturing Company in early 1923.  The new company was capitalized at one million dollars.  Soon, this group failed in pursuing their favored lower-volume approach, taking the company down with them.  Early in 1924, servicing rights to the now defunct Earl were sold to Standard Motor Parts Company of Detroit. Total Earl production was approximately 1,900 cars.

Rarity
There are only a handful of Earl Custom Roadsters left in the world. There have been persistent incorrect reports that an Earl Roadster is on display at the Ella Sharp Museum in Jackson, Michigan.  The museum curator has reported that people have driven as far as South Carolina to see the vehicle.  However the museum does not have such a vehicle  (as of 4 August 2011).  Private owners of Earl Roadsters are thought to exist in Jackson.

References

Defunct motor vehicle manufacturers of the United States
Motor vehicle manufacturers based in Michigan
Vintage vehicles
Vehicle manufacturing companies established in 1921
Vehicle manufacturing companies disestablished in 1923
1921 establishments in Michigan
1923 disestablishments in Michigan
Defunct manufacturing companies based in Michigan